A referendum took place in the Cook Islands on 1 August 2022. Voters were called upon by the government of Prime Minister Mark Brown to decide on the legalisation of medical cannabis. The referendum results are non-binding, with the Parliament elected on the same day being free to implement the policy or not.

A majority of participating voters supported legalisation, with 62% voting yes, 35% voting no, and 3% informal.

References

Medical
Cook Islands
Election and referendum articles with incomplete results
Referendums in the Cook Islands
Cook Islands